Conus robini is a species of sea snail, a marine gastropod mollusc in the family Conidae, the cone snails, cone shells or cones.

These snails are predatory and venomous. They are capable of "stinging" humans.

The epithet of this species was named after Alain Robin.

Description
The size of the shell varies between 20 mm and 32 mm.

Distribution
This marine species is endemic to the Philippines, off Balabac Island.

References

 L. Limpalaër & E. Monnier (2012): Pionoconus robini (Gastropoda: Conidae) New Species from the South Western Philippines - Visaya Vol. 3 n°6
 Puillandre N., Duda T.F., Meyer C., Olivera B.M. & Bouchet P. (2015). One, four or 100 genera? A new classification of the cone snails. Journal of Molluscan Studies. 81: 1-23

External links
 To World Register of Marine Species
 

robini
Gastropods described in 2012